Dionisio Emanuel Villalba Rojano (born 21 December 1989), commonly known as Dioni, is a Spanish footballer who plays as a striker for CD Atlético Baleares.

Club career
Born in Málaga, Andalusia, Dioni joined Deportivo de La Coruña in 2010 at the age of 20, being assigned to the reserves initially. He only made five competitive appearances with the first team during his tenure, his La Liga debut coming on 23 September 2010 when he came on as a second-half substitute for Adrián López in a 1–0 away loss against Villarreal CF.

In the summer of 2012, Dioni signed with Udinese Calcio, being consecutively loaned to CD Leganés (Segunda División B), Hércules CF (Segunda División, where he scored his first and only goal as a professional in a 2–2 home draw with RCD Mallorca on 15 September 2013) and Cádiz CF (third level) and failing to play any official matches with the Italians. He met the same fate at his next club Granada CF, having temporary spells at Leganés, Real Oviedo and Racing de Santander – all sides competed in division three.

Dioni moved to CF Fuenlabrada on a three-year contract on 6 July 2016, netting 24 times in his first season in an eventual elimination in the third tier promotion play-offs. On 10 December 2017, early into the following campaign, he scored five goals in the 7–0 home rout of Coruxo FC.

On 1 August 2018, the 28-year-old Dioni moved abroad for the first time in his career, signing a two-year deal with Polish club Lech Poznań. The following transfer window, however, he returned to his homeland and agreed to a two-and-a-half-year contract at third-division Cultural y Deportiva Leonesa.

Career statistics

Club

References

External links

1989 births
Living people
Spanish footballers
Footballers from Málaga
Association football forwards
La Liga players
Segunda División players
Segunda División B players
Primera Federación players
Caravaca CF players
Deportivo Fabril players
Deportivo de La Coruña players
Cádiz CF players
CD Leganés players
Hércules CF players
Granada CF footballers
Real Oviedo players
Racing de Santander players
CF Fuenlabrada footballers
Cultural Leonesa footballers
CD Atlético Baleares footballers
Udinese Calcio players
Ekstraklasa players
Lech Poznań players
Spanish expatriate footballers
Expatriate footballers in Poland
Spanish expatriate sportspeople in Poland